Mohammed Salim Khalfan Al-Mashari (born 4 December 1990), commonly known as Mohammed Al-Mashari, is an Omani footballer who plays for Fanja SC.

Club career

On 2 July 2014, he agreed a contract extension with 2013–14 Oman Professional League runners-up Fanja SC.

Club career statistics

International career
Mohammed is part of the first team squad of the Oman national football team. He was selected for the national team for the first time in 2012. He made his first appearance for Oman on 8 December 2012 against Lebanon in the 2012 WAFF Championship. He has made appearances in the 2012 WAFF Championship and has represented the national team in the 2014 FIFA World Cup qualificationvand the 2015 AFC Asian Cup qualification. He is the most highly rated young creative midfielder in Oman. Al-Maashari is a brilliant passer of the ball and he has great skill and technique with the ball. Mohammed Al-Maashari is a regular with the national team and he is expected to show his skills at the upcoming Asian Cup in Australia in 2015. The fact that the young Mohammed Al-Maashari wears the coveted number 10 jersey for Fanja(Oman's best club), speaks highly of his talent.

Honours

Club
With Fanja
Omani League (0): Runner-up 2012–13
Sultan Qaboos Cup (1): 2013
Oman Super Cup (1): 2012; Runner-Up 2013, 2014

References

External links

Mohamed Al Maashari at Goal.com

1990 births
Living people
People from Muscat, Oman
Omani footballers
Oman international footballers
Association football midfielders
Bowsher Club players
Fanja SC players
Oman Professional League players
People from Muscat Governorate